Halmaheramys is a genus of rodent in the family Muridae endemic to the Moluccas, Indonesia.

It contains the following species:
 Spiny Boki Mekot rat (Halmaheramys bokimekot)
 Wallace's large spiny rat (Halmaheramys wallacei)

References

 
Rodents of Indonesia